Dammam is the fifth-most populous city in Saudi Arabia after Riyadh, Jeddah, Mecca, and Medina. It is the capital of the Eastern Province. With a total population of 1,252,523 as of 2020. The judicial and administrative bodies of the province, in addition to the administrative offices of other minor governmental departments functioning within the province, are located in the city. The word itself is generally used to refer to the city, but may also refer to its eponymous governorate.

Dammam is known for being a major administrative center for the Saudi oil industry. Dammam constitutes the core of the Dammam metropolitan area, also known as the Greater Dammam area, which comprises the 'Triplet Cities' of Dammam, Dhahran and Khobar. The area has an estimated population of 4,140,000 as of 2012 and is closely linked to the city through social, economic, and cultural ties. The city is growing at an exceptionally fast rate of 12% a year – the fastest in Saudi Arabia, the GCC, and the Arab world. As of 2016, Greater Dammam is the fourth largest metropolitan area by both area and population in the Gulf Cooperation Council.

The area that eventually became Dammam was settled by the Dawasir tribe around 1923, with permission of King Ibn Saud. The area was originally a fishing hamlet and was developed into its current state within half a century soon after the discovery of oil in the region, both as a port city and an administrative center. With the unification of Saudi Arabia, Dammam was made the capital of the newly formed Eastern Province.

Dammam's King Abdul Aziz Sea Port is the largest on the Persian Gulf, its import-export traffic second only to the historic Jeddah Islamic Port in the Middle East and North Africa (MENA).

Dammam is also a member-city in the World Energy Cities Partnership (WECP).

History

Etymology 
The origins of the name Dammam are disputed. Some suggest the name is onomatopoeic and was given to the area because of a drum positioned in a nearby keep, which was sounded in a pattern called damdamah to alert the residents of returning fishermen's ships; others say that the name comes from the word dawwama (whirlpool), indicating a nearby site that fishing dhows usually had to avoid.

Foundation (1923–1932) 

Dammam was founded in 1923 by the Al Dawasir tribe that migrated from Bahrain after King Abdul Aziz allowed them to settle within the area. The tribe initially settled in Khobar, which was chosen for its proximity to the island of Bahrain as the tribe had hoped to go back there soon, but the British made it tough for them to maneuver. However, this gave the population of Khobar a lift, together with the formation of close ties with the larger city of Dammam.

Search for and discovery of oil (1932-1940s) 

The planning of drilling wells in Dammam Started in the spring of 1933 In Jeddah, when an oil concession agreement was signed by both the government of King Abd al-Aziz Al Saud and the representatives of  the Standard Oil Company of California. A team of geologists was sent to Dammam, they finalized their plans for the wells in the beginning of June 1934. The work on the cellar for the first drilling rig in Dammam started approximately in January 1935, and ended on the 19th of February. On April 30th 1935, the work began on drilling the 1st oil well in Dammam. When Dammam No. 1 didn't produce promising result, the work on it stopped on the 4th of January of 1936, and  Dammam No. 2 was drilled. Because of the promising results, there were plans to drill 5 more wells in the surrounding area of Dammam No. 2.Between June and early September of 1936, the production of all of these drills were monitored closely, and most of them were disappointing.  On December 7th of 1936 the work started on Dammam No. 1, at the beginning the drilling didn’t produce promising results. However, by the 4th of March of 1938, Well No.7 started producing a promising amount of oil. Saudi Aramco, dug the famous Dammam Well No. 7, now designated the 'Prosperity Well,' that proved that the kingdom possessed an oversized supply of hydrocarbons.

Phase of rapid growth (1940s-1960s) 

The discovery of recent oil fields around Dammam within the 1940s and 50s, which now account for 25% of the world's proven oil reserves, triggered a construction boom. The Al Bin Ali family, led by Sheikh Muhammad bin Nasir Al Bin Ali and his brothers, played a vital role in the development of town and also the region in various fields. Their company, Al Bin Ali and Brothers, was the primary Saudi construction company that took part within the expansion of Aramco. a number of their projects were the roads connecting Dammam to the northern oil wells, Highway 40, which connected Dammam to Riyadh; now referred to simply as the Dammam Road, and multiple expansions of the King Abdul Aziz Port. This led to experts and technicians from in and round the kingdom gathering to assist in the hunt for new oil fields and bring them on-stream. New pipelines, storage facilities, and jetties were also constructed to handle tankers.

Service industries sprouted up to support the industry and meet the needs and requirements of individuals living within the newly founded metropolitan area. As it has in other parts of the dominion, the Ministry of Health has established several modern hospitals and a network of healthcare facilities within the Dammam Area. These are supplemented by hospitals and clinics operated by the private sector.

Modern history (1960s-present) 
Within a few decades, a locality that had several hundred inhabitants some sixty years ago now boasts a population of more than 1.5 million, and is still growing at a sustained high rate. The Dammam area, unlike other oil towns, has developed in multiple fields. Including hosting the administration of the Saudi oil industry, it is also a contemporary urban and industrial center. As this sector was growing within the early years, the Saudi government took steps to facilitate the evolution of the area. New roads and highways connected the booming city to other urban and industrial centers within the Kingdom. A railway line connected Dammam to the agricultural center of Kharj and on to Riyadh. Dhahran International Airport was established to further enhance the region's connection to other parts of the country and the world. Later, all commercial air transport facilities were transferred to the larger King Fahd International Airport, approximately 20 kilometers (12 miles) northwest of Dammam.

To encourage the expansion of non-oil industries, an industrial city was established within the open space between the three cities. Now home to 124 factories, the first Industrial City of Dammam was quickly surrounded by an urban mass. As a result, a second industrial city was established further far from the Dammam Area along Highway 615. These plants manufacture a range of products that are marketed throughout the kingdom and also exported to other countries. Handling such exports and other imports is carried out by several shipping agents and commercial companies spread throughout the area.

The Dammam Area was designed from the outset on the principles of contemporary urban planning. Residential areas are clearly separated from commercial ones, the roads are broad and straight and buildings conform to a plan. One of the most significant factors contributing to the growth of the area was land reclamation; vast stretches of the shallow Persian Gulf were reclaimed. Water is provided by desalination plants that pump approximately seven million cubic feet of treated water every day. The supply of water underpins the urban and industrial growth of the Dammam Area, and provisions are being made for expanding existing desalination facilities to satisfy future growth. Dammam is a member-city in the World Energy Cities Partnership (WECP).

Geography

Climate 
Much like most of Saudi Arabia, Dammam features a hot desert climate (BWh) under the Köppen climate classification.

Rainfall in Dammam is generally sparse, and usually occurs in small amounts in the winter months of November, December and January; with periodic heavy thunderstorms. Hail generally falls during the colder months of December and January. Lighter showers occur during spring but are much rarer.

Summer temperatures are extremely hot, owing to the region's geographic location; and continually exceed during daylight hours from March to October. Dust storms, known locally as shamals, are common in summer, and generally come from the north.

Environment

Environmental concerns

There is evidence that several building foundations and underground infrastructures in Dammam have been structurally weakened by a rising water table. Various sources, including precipitation, seawater intrusion and leakage from underground water networks and sewage pipes, were anecdotally suspected to be contributors to the rising shallow water-table problem. A recent study by T. M. Iwalewa and others has revealed that leakages from drinking-water supply and sewage-collection pipe networks are the major contributors to the rise in the water table in the city. The study showed that the rising shallow water-table problem represents a serious threat to the present and future development of the city.

Transportation

Air
Dammam is served by the King Fahd International Airport, the largest airport in the world in terms of land area. Being the main airport in the Eastern Province, Dammam is well connected by air with other cities in the Middle East, Asia, Africa and Europe. The airport is a hub for SaudiGulf Airlines.

Sea
The King Abdul Aziz Sea Port, located on the coast of the Persian Gulf, is the second largest and second busiest port in Saudi Arabia. It is also the largest port in the Persian Gulf. It was founded in the late 1940s. It has large equipment that allows it to receive various types of vessels. The most important equipments are 56 multi-purpose hoist, 8 container cranes, and 524 tanker containers. There are a number of berths for ships and fishing, as well as ship repair yard.

Road
Eastern Province cities like Abqaiq, Dhahran, Hofuf, Jubail (Dhahran–Jubail Highway), Khafji, Khobar (Dammam-Khobar Highway), Ras Tanura, Sihat and Qatif (Gulf Road), as well as many cities in other parts of the Kingdom are linked with Dammam by 8-lane highways. Dammam is connected to the Saudi capital, Riyadh and Jeddah on the west coast by Highway 40. Dammam also has highways to other Middle-Eastern countries such as Kuwait (Abu Hadriyah Highway), Oman, Qatar and the United Arab Emirates.

Dammam has no intra-city public transport service. Inter-city bus services are operated from Dammam by the Saudi Arabian Public Transport Company (SAPTCO). Bus services connect Dammam with Khobar and other cities across the Middle East.

Rail
The headquarters of the Saudi Railways Organization (SRO), one of Saudi Arabia's two railway operators, is in Dammam. The passenger terminal in Dammam was the first built in Saudi Arabia and was built in 1981. It is considered to be a major terminal in the Saudi railway network.

Dammam will serve as an important junction on the proposed Gulf Railway connecting all six GCC member states. The city is located along the proposed main line connecting Kuwait with Oman via Saudi Arabia and the UAE. A branch line connecting Bahrain to Dammam are also part of the proposed project.

Two future railway projects connecting Dammam to Jeddah via Riyadh and Mecca in the western region and Dammam with Jubail have been proposed.

Rapid transit

An integrated public transport system for Dammam was approved by the Council of Ministers on 19 May 2014, and publicly announced by Mayor Fahad Al Jubair on 21 May 2014. The light rail system will have two lines. The first line will link Tarout Island with King Fahd Causeway via Qatif, Dammam and Dhahran. The second line will connect central Dammam to the King Fahd International Airport. Studies to finalize the alignment and location of the stations should have taken an estimated 18 months. The Dammam Metro is expected to open in 2021, but its current official status is unknown.

Culture

Entertainment 
As part of the Saudi Government's Vision 2030 program that aims at diversifying the non-oil revenues in Saudi Arabia, the Saudi Public Investment Fund (PIF) has planned to establish entertainment destinations in the Eastern Province. This would include the establishment of amusement parks and the building of several entertainment facilities such as theatres.

Sports

Football is the national sport of Saudi Arabia and the most popular sport in Dammam. The Prince Mohammed bin Fahd Stadium is the city's primary stadium and football venue. It serves as the home ground for Saudi Professional League's Ettifaq FC and Saudi First Division's Al-Nahda Club. More traditional sports such as camel racing, falconry, basketball and equestrianism are still practiced. Cricket is popular among the South Asian expatriates living in the city.

Shopping

 Dammam is home to many local markets and malls. Among the local markets is “Souq Al hob” and “Souq Al Dammam”. Both of these markets sell commodities that are local to the region and regular commodities as well. Some of the malls in Dammam are “Alothaim Mall”, and “Marina Mall”, they both provide the customers with world known brands.

Demographics
In 1950, Dammam had a population of 22,000. By 2000, the population soared to 759,000 people. Dammam was the world's tenth fastest growing city in terms of population growth rates during that 50-year period. According to a report released by the Central Department of Statistics and Information, the population of Dammam was 903,000 as of December 2010, making it the sixth most populous city in Saudi Arabia and the most populous in the Eastern Province.

According to statistics released by the Ministry of Economy and Planning, in 2011, home ownership among Saudi citizens in Dammam was 42.4%.

About a quarter of the city (20-25%) follows Shia Islam, but are subject to persecution at the hands of the Wahhabi ideology the Saudi government follows. The Imam Husayn Mosque is the only Shia masjid for the city's estimated 150,000 Shia. Demonstrations on the Day of Ashura have been banned by the Saudi government.

Human resources

Healthcare 
The Saudi Arabian Ministry of Health oversees the medical facilities across the kingdom. Hospitals and polyclinics located in the urban core of Dammam tend to be concentrated around one central building. Some of the public/government-funded hospitals operated directly by the MoH include the Dammam Medical Complex (also known as the Dammam Central Hospital), the King Fahd Specialist Hospital (KFSH) which shares its compound the Maternity and Children's Hospital (MCH), and the Imam Abdulrahman Bin Faisal Hospital which shares its compound with the Imam Abdulrahman Bin Faisal University. Two hospitals targeting members of the Saudi Arabian Armed Forces are the Security Forces Hospital and the King Fahd Military Medical Complex.

In addition to these public hospitals and polyclinics, several private hospitals and medical centers are also present within Dammam. The most well-known of these is the AGH Dammam or Al Mana Group of Hospitals, Dammam which is part of the Al Mana Group of Hospitals run by Ebrahim Al Mana and Bros., which claims to be the largest medical company & healthcare provider in the Eastern Province. Other private hospitals in and around the city include the Arrawdha Hospital, Al Mouwasat Hospital, the Dammam Private Medical Complex (Formerly Dammam Medical Dispensary), Gama Hospital (formerly Astoon Hospital), among others. One of the largest medical complexes in the kingdom, the Dr. Sulaiman Al Habib Complex is located between Dammam and Khobar off Highway 605.

Education 
Dammam has a large number of schools, universities and colleges. Schools teaching various syllabus and in several different languages of instruction can be found.

Primary and secondary education
Dammam has a large number of both Saudi and international schools that are either public or private schools. Most of the Saudi schools are public and run by the government, while most of the international schools are private. Most of the international schools are Indian schools affiliated with the Central Board of Secondary Education, although a few schools teaching American, British, Pakistani, Filipino, Bangladeshi curricula, along with schools teaching curricula of other nations also exist.

Higher education and research
Some of the well-known universities in the region include the Imam Abdulrahman Bin Faisal University (formerly known as the University of Dammam) located off Highway 610, the King Fahd University of Petroleum and Minerals (also known as KFUPM and UPM) which shares its compound with Saudi Aramco and the Prince Mohammad bin Fahd University which is located in south-west Khobar.

Dammam Governorate 
The Dammam Governorate is one of the 12 governorates of the Eastern Province. The governorate includes parts of other cities in the Dammam metropolitan area, most notably the entirety of Dhahran, as the city is not part of its own governorate. The majority of its area besides the cities of Dammam and Dhahran is uninhabited desert, with the two major exceptions being the King Fahd International Airport and the Second Industrial City of Dammam.

The governorate is bounded by the Persian Gulf to the northeast and the Khobar Governorate to the southeast. To its south lies Half Moon Bay, while its west is covered by the comparatively larger governorates of Jubail in the northwest and Buqayq in southwest. Its northern reaches are bordered by the smaller Qatif Governorate to the northwest and the Tarout Bay to the northeast.

See also

Khobar
Saudi Ports Authority

References

 Dammam City Guide 
 T.M. Iwalewa et al. / Journal of Hydro-environment Research 12 (2016) 46–58

Further reading

 Dammam Capital City in Eastern Province (1998).
 Dammam King Fahd International Airport (1999).

External links

 Municipality of Dammam Official website 

 
Geography of Saudi Arabia
Populated coastal places in Saudi Arabia
Port cities and towns in Saudi Arabia
Port cities and towns of the Persian Gulf
Populated places in Eastern Province, Saudi Arabia
Saudi Arabia articles needing attention
Provincial capitals of Saudi Arabia
Populated places established in 1923
1923 establishments in Asia